Carlos Manuel Prío Socarrás (July 14, 1903 – April 5, 1977) was a Cuban politician. He served as the President of Cuba from 1948 until he was deposed by a military coup led by Fulgencio Batista on March 10, 1952, three months before new elections were to be held. He was the first president of Cuba to be born in an independent Cuba and the last to gain his post through universal, contested elections. He went into exile in the United States, where he lived for 25 years before dying by suicide at age 73.

Governance 
In 1940, Prío was elected senator of Pinar del Río Province. Four years later, fellow Partido Auténtico member Ramón Grau became president, and during the Grau administration Prío served turns as Minister of Public Works, Minister of Labor and Prime Minister. On July 1, 1948, he was elected president of Cuba as a member of the Partido Auténtico.  Prío was assisted by Chief of the Armed Forces General Genobebo Pérez Dámera and Colonel José Luis Chinea Cardenas, who had previously been in charge of the Province of Santa Clara.

The eight years under Grau and Prío, were, according to Charles Ameringer,
[...] unique in Cuban history. They were a time of constitutional order and political freedom. They were not 'golden years' by any means, but in two elections (1944 and 1948), Cubans had the opportunity to express their desire for a rule of civil liberties, primacy of Cuban culture, and achievement of economic independence. If there were sharp contradictions in Cuban society under the Auténticos, the circumstances differed only in degree from the complexities and dynamics encountered in free societies everywhere (how often did Cubans compare Havana with Chicago?).
Prío, called el presidente cordial ("the cordial president"), was committed to a rule marked by civility, primarily in its respect for freedom of expression. Several public-works projects and the establishment of a National Bank and Tribunal of Accounts count among his successes.

However, violence among political factions and reports of theft and self-enrichment in the government ranks marred Prío's term. The Prío administration increasingly came to be perceived by the public as ineffectual in the face of violence and corruption, much as the Grau administration before it.

With elections scheduled for the middle of 1952, rumors surfaced of a planned military coup by long-shot presidential contender Fulgencio Batista. Prío, seeing no constitutional basis to act, did not do so. The rumors proved to be true. On March 10, 1952, Batista and his collaborators seized military and police commands throughout the country and occupied major radio and TV stations. Batista assumed power when Prío, failing to mount a resistance, boarded a plane and went into exile.

According to Arthur M. Schlesinger Jr., Prío later said of his presidency:

They say that I was a terrible president of Cuba. That may be true. But I was the best president Cuba ever had.

Personal life and death 

Prio first married Inés Georgina (Gina) Karell Pedrosa and they had one daughter, Rocío Guadalupe Prío-Karell. He married María Dolores "Mary" Tarrero-Serrano (1924-2010) on June 17, 1945, in the Chapel of the Presidential Palace, and they had two daughters, María Antonetta Prío-Tarrero (married to César Odio, former City Manager of the City of Miami) and María Elena Prío-Tarrero (divorced from Alfredo Duran, former chairman of the Florida Democratic Party). He also had two recognized children with his former mistress, Celia Rosa Touzet Masfera: Carlos Prio-Touzet, an architect, and Rodolfo (Rudy) Prío-Touzet.

Prío died by suicide by gunshot to the chest on April 5, 1977, in Miami Beach, Florida, at age 73. He and his wife Mary are buried at Woodlawn Park Cemetery and Mausoleum (now Caballero Rivero Woodlawn North Park Cemetery and Mausoleum) in Miami, Florida.

References

Further reading
  (Spanish)
 Anuario Social de la Habana 1939, (Luz – Hilo S.A.)
 Libro de Oro de la Sociedad Habanera, (Editorial Lex, 1950)
 / Time magazine, February 24, 1947
 / Time magazine, June 14, 1948
 / Time magazine, April 18, 1977
Un Presidente Cordial:Carlos Prio Socarras, 1927–1964, by Mario Riera Hernandez, Ediciones Universal, Miami 1970.
"En Defensa Del Autenticismo" – Aracelio Azcuy Y Cruz, Julio 1950, La Habana, P. Fernandez Y Cia.

External links 

 Carlos Prio Socarrás' Photo & Gravesite
 

1903 births
1977 suicides
People from Bahía Honda, Cuba
Partido Auténtico politicians
Presidents of Cuba
Government ministers of Cuba
Cuban senators
Leaders ousted by a coup
Suicides by firearm in Florida
Cuban politicians who committed suicide
1977 deaths